Molenwaard is a former municipality in the western Netherlands, in the southeastern part of the province of South Holland, and the northwestern part of the region of Alblasserwaard. It was the result of a merger of the municipalities of Graafstroom, Liesveld, and Nieuw-Lekkerland on 1 January 2013. On 1 January 2019 it merged with Giessenlanden, together they form the new municipality of Molenlanden. The largest settlements are Bleskensgraaf, Groot-Ammers, and Nieuw-Lekkerland.

Molenwaard can be characterized as a landscape of polders existing of vast pastures traversed by ditches and canals, like the Groote- of Achterwaterschap, and the Ammersche Boezem. In the outermost northwest one can find the famous windmills of Kinderdijk. About 1.5 m below sea level, the municipality is bordered by the Lek river in the north and briefly the Noord river in the west. On its area flows the Graafstroom or the Alblas.

Religiously, the municipality is part of the Bible Belt, resulting in the dominance of the Christian parties in politics.

Localities 
Molenwaard consists of the following settlements:

Topography 

Dutch Topographic map of the municipality of Molenwaard, June 2015

Politics 
The municipal council of Molenwaard consists of 21 seats, which are divided as follows:

Notable people 

 Johannes Gysius (ca. 1583 – 1652 in Streefkerk) a Dutch historian and minister
 Fop Smit (1777 in Alblasserdam – 1866) a Dutch naval architect, shipbuilder, and shipowner
 Aart den Boer (1852 in Nieuw-Lekkerland – 1941) a Dutch architect and contractor
 Simon Bon (1904 in Nieuwpoort – 1987) a Dutch rower, competed at the 1924 and 1928 Summer Olympics
 Herbertus Bikker (1915 in Wijngaarden – 2008) a Dutch war criminal and member of the Waffen-SS
 Els Veder-Smit (born 1921 in Kinderdijk) a retired Dutch politician
 Willem Aantjes (1923 in Bleskensgraaf – 2015) a Dutch politician and jurist
 Ad Dekkers (1938 in Nieuwpoort - 1974) a Dutch artist of reliefs 
 Gert Schutte (born 1939 in Nieuwpoort) a retired Dutch politician and teacher
 Dirk van der Borg (born 1955 in Thesinge) a Dutch politician, Mayor of Molenwaard since 2013
 Corien Wortmann-Kool (born 1959 in Oud-Alblas) a Dutch politician and Member of the European Parliament
 Maarten Demmink (born in 1967 in Goudriaan) known as Demiak, is a Dutch painter, photographer and sculptor
 Merijn Korevaar (born 1994) and Jeanne Korevaar (born 1996) Dutch racing cyclists born in Groot-Ammers

References

External links 

  Official website

Molenlanden
Former municipalities of South Holland
Municipalities of the Netherlands established in 2013
Municipalities of the Netherlands disestablished in 2019